Kevin Paul Mmahat (Mama-Hat) (born November 9, 1964) is a former Major League Baseball (MLB) pitcher.

Biography
Mmahat was born in Memphis, Tennessee and graduated from Tulane University, where he pitched for the Tulane Green Wave baseball team.  He was drafted by the Texas Rangers in the 31st round of the 1987 Major League Baseball Draft, and was traded to the New York Yankees a year later.

Mmahat made his MLB debut on September 9, 1989 and played in his final MLB game on October 1, 1989.  In his MLB career, Mmahat pitched  innings and attained an ERA of 12.91.

Personal life
He is married to the former Gina Tedesco with whom he has three children.

He owns and operates an exterior coating company called Mid South Coatings in New Orleans, Louisiana.

References

External links
 

Kevin Mmahat in the Baseball Almanac

Major League Baseball pitchers
1964 births
Living people
Grace King High School alumni
New York Yankees players
Tulane Green Wave baseball players
Baseball players from Memphis, Tennessee
Gulf Coast Rangers players
Fort Lauderdale Yankees players
Albany-Colonie Yankees players
Columbus Clippers players
Gulf Coast Yankees players